The 1976 United States presidential election in Texas was held on November 2, 1976, as part of the 1976 United States presidential election. Texas was won by former governor Jimmy Carter of Georgia with 51.14% of the vote, giving him 26 electoral votes. This result made Texas about 1% more Democratic than the nation-at-large. He also beat the incumbent President Gerald Ford in the general election. To date, this remains the last time that a Democratic presidential candidate won Texas, and the last time Texas voted to the left of the nation-at-large. 

Carter's southern roots as a former governor of Georgia struck a chord with many voters in Texas, along with strong anti-Republican sentiment following Watergate. Still, this was a relatively weak performance for a victorious Democratic candidate in Texas, and two factors can be identified. One was Carter's underwhelming performance in the more rural counties, and the second being President Ford's strong performances in Dallas and Harris counties, and some of their surrounding suburbs. The rise of the Republican Party in these areas would result in Ronald Reagan’s win in the state four years later.

Carter carried 191 of the state's 254 counties, including seventy-four which have never voted Democratic since, namely Martin, Grayson, Chambers, Motley, Gaines, Live Oak, Mason, Sherman, Colorado, Stephens, Lamb, Oldham, Floyd, Real, Fayette, Terry, Donley, Parmer, Dallam, Moore, Hale, Wheeler, Bailey, Armstrong, Hamilton, Goliad, Carson, Childress, Collingsworth, Wilbarger, Wilson, Castro, Eastland, Gonzales, Parker, Hood, Johnson, Anderson, Brazoria, Matagorda, Kinney, Medina, Wharton, Lavaca, Archer, Bosque, Aransas, Bell, Borden, Brown, Burnet, Callahan, Cochran, Coryell, Walker, Shackelford, King, Jeff Davis, Wichita, McLennan, Llano, Hockley, Garza, Hunt, Young, Wood, Jackson, Lynn, Howard, Ellis, and Lampasas Counties. Consequently, this also makes Carter the most recent Democrat to win a majority of Texas's counties.

Primaries

Democratic primaries
 Jimmy Carter - 47.65%
 Lloyd Bentsen - 22.20%
 George Wallace - 17.53%

Republican primaries
 Ronald Reagan - 66.36%
 Gerald Ford - 33.37%

Results

Results by county

See also
 United States presidential elections in Texas

References

1976
Texas
1976 Texas elections